Polypoetes luteivena is a moth of the family Notodontidae. It is found in Colombia and Venezuela.

The larvae feed on Paullinia macrophylla.

References

Moths described in 1864
Notodontidae of South America